Pattinama is a Moluccan surname. It may refer to:

Edinho Pattinama (born 1989), Dutch footballer
Jordao Pattinama (born 1989), Dutch footballer
Shayne Pattynama (born 1998), Dutch footballer
Ton Pattinama (born 1956), Dutch footballer

See also 

 Lesley Pattinama Kerkhove

People of Moluccan descent